Francis Allen (born November 26, 1961) is an American sports shooter. He competed in the men's 10 metre running target event at the 1992 Summer Olympics.

References

External links
 

1961 births
Living people
American male sport shooters
Olympic shooters of the United States
Shooters at the 1992 Summer Olympics
People from New London, Wisconsin
Sportspeople from Wisconsin
Pan American Games medalists in shooting
Pan American Games gold medalists for the United States
Shooters at the 1991 Pan American Games
Medalists at the 1991 Pan American Games
21st-century American people
20th-century American people